Sixteen referendums were held in Switzerland during 1993. The first three were held on 7 March on a federal law to raise fuel taxes (approved), a federal resolution on lifting the ban on gambling establishments (approved) and a popular initiative on banning animal testing (rejected). The next two were held on 6 June on two popular initiatives; "40 military training areas are enough–environment projection at military" and "for a Switzerland without new warplanes". Both were rejected by voters.

The next set of five referendums was held on 26 September on a federal resolution on the misuse of weaponry (approved), whether Laufen should be part of the Basel-Landschaft canton (approved), a popular initiative on creating a new Swiss National Day on 1 August (approved), a federal resolution on a temporary halt to increase in the cost of health insurance (approved) and a federal resolution on unemployment insurance (approved).

The final set of six referendums was held on 28 November on federal resolutions on the financial order (approved), recovering money owed to the federal government (approved), measures for preserving social insurance (approved) and special excise taxes (approved), as well as popular initiatives "on the reduction of alcohol problems" and "on the reduction of tobacco problems", both of which were rejected.

Results

References

1993 elections in Switzerland
1993 referendums
Referendums in Switzerland